The Sekhoutoureah Presidential Palace in Conakry, Guinea is the official residence of the President of Guinea. The Palais Presidentiel Sekhoutoureah is behind the Cathédrale Sainte-Marie.

References

See also
List of buildings and structures in Guinea

External links

Buildings and structures in Conakry
Presidential residences
Palaces in Guinea
Chinese aid to Africa